Chisocheton sarawakanus is a tree in the family Meliaceae. It is named for Malaysia's Sarawak state.

Description
The bark is coloured fawn to chocolate. The sweetly scented flowers are white.

Distribution and habitat
Chisocheton sarawakanus is found in Sumatra, Peninsular Malaysia and Borneo. Its habitat is rain forests from sea-level to  altitude.

References

sarawakanus
Trees of Sumatra
Trees of Peninsular Malaysia
Trees of Borneo
Plants described in 1878